The following is a list of 2020 UCI Women's Teams and riders for the 2020 women's road cycling season.

World Teams

Alé BTC Ljubljana

Canyon–SRAM

CCC Liv

FDJ Nouvelle-Aquitaine Futuroscope

Mitchelton–Scott

Movistar Team

Team Sunweb

Trek–Segafredo

Continental Teams

Agolico

Aromitalia–Basso Bikes–Vaiano

Astana

Bepink

Biehler Krush Pro Cycling

Bigla–Katusha

Bizkaia–Durango

Boels–Dolmans

CAMS–Tifosi

Cronos–Casa Dorada

Ceratizit–WNT Pro Cycling

Charente–Maritime Women Cycling

Chevalmeire Cycling Team

Ciclotel

Cogeas–Mettler–Look

DNA Pro Cycling

Doltcini–Van Eyck

Drops

Eneicat–RBH Global

Eurotarget–Bianchi–Vittoria

Hitec Products–Birk Sport

InstaFund La Prima

Lotto–Soudal Ladies

Lviv Cycling Team

Macogep Tornatech Girondins de Bordeaux

Massi–Tactic

Minsk Cycling Club

Multum Accountants–LSK Ladies Cycling Team

NXTG Racing

Parkhotel Valkenburg

Pro Cycling Team Fanini

Rally Cycling

Río Miera–Cantabria Deporte

Roxsolt Attaquer

Servetto–Piumate–Beltrami TSA

Sestroretsk

Sopela Women's Team

Team Arkéa

Team Illuminate

Thailand Women's Cycling Team

Tibco–Silicon Valley Bank

Top Girls Fassa Bortolo

Valcar–Travel & Service

VIB–Natural Greatness

WCC Team

References

2020